The Pakistan Observer is one of the oldest and widely read English-language daily newspapers of Pakistan. It is published in six cities – Islamabad, Karachi, Lahore, Quetta, Peshawar, and Muzaffarabad. The newspaper was founded in 1988 by the veteran journalist late Zahid Malik.

Topics the newspaper covers include politics, international affairs, economics, investment, sports and culture. It runs a leading Sunday magazine called SocialDiary, which includes social commentary, interviews, fashion, recipes, reviews, travel advice, blogs and technology news.

Background and outlook
The newspaper was first published on 1 November 1988 in Islamabad, making it the first newspaper to be published in the capital city. The newspaper is now led by Faisal Zahid Malik, who is also the editor-in-chief. The head office is in the capital city Islamabad, and it has four other offices in Karachi, Lahore, Peshawar, and Muzaffarabad. Abdus Sattar, former Foreign Minister of Pakistan, is the lead current affairs analyst of this newspaper. He focuses on international security.

The daily Pakistan Observer is one of the largest circulated English newspapers of Pakistan, being published simultaneously from Islamabad, Karachi, Lahore, Peshawar and Quetta.

In 2019, its readership and Newspaper Web Ranking within Pakistan, rated by the International Media & Newspapers website, was ranked 10.

See also 

 List of newspapers in Pakistan

References

External links
 Pakistan Observer official website

1988 establishments in Pakistan
English-language newspapers published in Pakistan
Daily newspapers published in Pakistan
Mass media in Islamabad
Organisations based in Islamabad
Publications established in 1988